On a Wing & a Prayer is the seventh studio album by Gerry Rafferty. The album includes three tracks co-written with Rafferty’s brother Jim, also a singer-songwriter, who had been signed to Decca Records in the 1970s. The music was heavily influenced by Rafferty's divorce from his wife Carla Ventilla  in 1990.   They were married for 20 years.

Track listing 
All tracks composed by Gerry Rafferty; except where indicated.
"Time's Caught Up on You" - 4:21
"I See Red" (Jim Rafferty) - 4:05
"It's Easy to Talk" - 4:29
"I Could Be Wrong" - 3:59
"Don't Speak of My Heart" (Gerry Rafferty, Jim Rafferty) - 5:55
"Get Out of My Life Woman" (Allen Toussaint) - 4:11
"Don't Give Up on Me" - 4:59
"Hang On" - 4:00
"Love and Affection" - 6:25
"Does He Know What He's Taken On" - 4:56
"The Light of Love" (Gerry Rafferty, Jim Rafferty) - 4:57
"Life Goes On" - 5:22

Personnel 
 Gerry Rafferty – lead vocals, backing vocals, acoustic guitar (1, 3, 4, 6, 7), high-string guitar (5)
 Paweł Rosak – keyboards, bass programming (1, 2, 4, 6, 12), drum programming, percussion programming (1-4, 8, 10), brass programming (6, 10)
 Hugh Burns – electric guitars (1, 5, 8, 11), guitars (2, 6, 12), lead guitar (4, 9), rhythm guitar (4), electric rhythm guitar (10)
 B.J. Cole – pedal steel guitar (1, 3)
 Bryn Haworth – bottleneck guitar (3, 7, 8, 10), mandolin (7)
 Jerry Donahue – electric guitar (10)
 Mo Foster – bass guitar (3, 5, 7-12), fretless bass (6)
 Arran Ahmun – cymbal, hi-hat, tambourine, tom drum (1, 4, 11), congas (1), talking drum (1),  shaker (1, 7), cowbell (1, 2), agogôs (1), finger cymbals (1), castanets (2), brushes (7)
 Mel Collins – baritone saxophone (1, 8, 10, 12), soprano saxophone (2)
 Andrew Pryce Jackman – string arrangements (5, 9, 11, 12), bassoon arrangements (5), horn and oboe arrangements (9), brass and cor anglais arrangements (11)
 Gavyn Wright – string leader (5, 9, 11, 12)
 Liane Carroll – backing vocals (1-5, 7)
 Joe Egan – backing vocals (1-5, 7, 8, 10)
 Melanie Harrold – backing vocals (1-5, 7)
 Julian Littman – backing vocals (1-5, 7, 8, 10)
 Nicky Moore – backing vocals (1-5, 7, 8, 10)
 Jim Rafferty – backing vocals (4, 7)

Production 
 Gerry Rafferty – producer 
 Hugh Murphy – producer, recording, engineer 
 Barry Hammond – engineer 
 Doug Cook – assistant engineer 
 Mike Ross-Trevor – string recording 
 Dan Priest – mixing 
 Jim Rafferty – sleeve design, artwork 
 Chris McHugo – cover photography 
 SRS Typesetting – typography

Gerry Rafferty albums
1992 albums